The Pala da Tgiern is a mountain of the Swiss Lepontine Alps, overlooking Suraua in the canton of Graubünden. It lies north of the Crap Grisch, in the Val Lumnezia.

References

External links
 Pala da Tgiern on Hikr

Mountains of the Alps
Mountains of Switzerland
Mountains of Graubünden
Lepontine Alps